Jennifer Affleck may refer to:

 Jennifer Garner (born 1972), American actress married to Ben Affleck between 2005 and 2018
 Jennifer Lopez (born 1969), American musician and actress married to Ben Affleck since 2022